Alexandrian Kings is a 1912 poem by Constantine P. Cavafy which can be generally seen as a lesser-known poem from his anthology. He wrote this poem in the Spring of 1912 and was published soon after, in July 1912. This work is based on Cavafy’s appreciation for Ancient history, specifically that of Ancient Greece and Ancient Egypt. The poem is set during Cleopatra’s reign in Alexandria, as the name suggests.

Story 
“Alexandrian Kings” follows the grand debut of Cleopatra’s children: Alexander, Ptolemaios Philadelphos and Kaisarion, in 34 B.C Alexandria. Alexander and Ptolemaios Philadelphos were both sons of the famous Mark Antony; whereas, Kaisarion was the son of the Emperor Julius Caesar. Cleopatra assumes the role of the tragic hero. In this grand debut, she showcases her prosperity through her theatrics in the hopes of winning over the Alexandrian people but she is only rewarded with cynicism and disbelief. She is meant to represent the beginning of the end for the Ptolemaic Dynasty.

This work, although it depicts the extravagant lifestyle Cleopatra was perceived as leading (through the eyes of the poet Cavafy), also carries a bitter history with it. Only 4 years after the events of this poem Antony and Cleopatra were presumed dead by suicide. Kaisarion was executed, most scholars believing that it was death by asphyxiation, yet the exact circumstances of his death, are yet to be confirmed. The two younger sons were taken as hostages back to Rome. After this, they were not documented on any historical records and their deaths remain unknown, but they were presumed dead from illness in captivity.

Excerpt

References

See also 

 Alexandria 
 Caesarion
 Cleopatra
 Constantine P. Cavafy
 Julius Caesar 
 Mark Antony 
 Ptolemaic Dynasty

Cleopatra
Mark Antony
Julius Caesar
Constantine P. Cavafy
Alexandria
Ptolemaic Alexandria
Caesarion